Rex Eugene DeVogt (January 4, 1888 – November 9, 1935) was a Major League Baseball player. He played three games with the Boston Braves between April 17 and April 23, 1913.

References

External links
 

Boston Braves players
1888 births
1935 deaths
Baseball players from Michigan
Major League Baseball catchers
Victoria Bees players
Tacoma Tigers players
Spokane Indians players
Seattle Giants players
Toledo Mud Hens players
Cleveland Bearcats players
Cleveland Spiders players
South Bend Benders players
Toledo Iron Men players
People from Clare, Michigan